Malot Fort is a fort located in Chakwal District in the Punjab Province of Pakistan. It is part of Kalarkahar.

History

It was built in the 10th century AD and has the synthesis of Kashmiri and Greek architecture. 

Malot Fort built of local red sand stones of Salt Range mountains, is located on the road leading to Malot village near Choi village.

References

Chakwal District
Forts in Punjab, Pakistan